El Tepeyac Café, or simply El Tepeyac, is a longstanding Mexican restaurant in the Boyle Heights neighborhood of East Los Angeles. They are famous for their massive burritos, “Manuel’s Special Burrito” and the “Hollenbeck Burrito.” The original location is at 812 North Evergreen Avenue, Los Angeles, CA 90033.

History 
El Tepeyac Café is an authentic Mexican restaurant that was founded in 1942 by the Rojas family. It was originally named El Tupinamba Café and was located near downtown Los Angeles. The family later relocated to the Lincoln Heights area, just north of Boyle Heights, and opened a restaurant, La Villa Café. In 1952, the Rojas family relocated the restaurant to Boyle Heights, the current location of El Tepeyac Café.

After the death of his grandfather, Salvador Rojas, Manuel Rojas took over El Tepeyac Café and built it into the historic Boyle Heights landmark it is today. Manuel was known to his loyal customers as “Manny” or “Don Manuel” and is the well known creator of El Tepeyac’s most famous dishes, “Manuel’s Special Burrito” and the “Hollenbeck Burrito.”

The restaurant also boasts other authentic Mexican dishes including chile verde, fajitas, tacos, rice, beans, and many more. However, the “Manuel’s Special Burrito” and the “Hollenbeck Burrito” are the most well known additions to the El Tepeyac Menu.

“Manuel’s Special Burrito” is a five pound burrito that is the star of the Manuel’s Burrito Challenge, which has been attempted by many and successfully completed by few. Manuel’s Burrito Challenge was featured on Man vs. Food.

The “Hollenbeck Burrito” is another one of El Tepeyac Cafe’s most famous dishes. It is over five pounds and contains pork, red chile, rice, beans, guacamole, and is covered with chili verde sauce.  It is said that this burrito was created specifically for LAPD officers, from the local Hollenbeck Division, who often frequented El Tepeyac.

In 2009, there was concern over whether or not the restaurant would stay open due to land leasing issues. The Rojas family ensured customers their famous burritos would remain a Boyle Heights staple, and the restaurant did not relocate.

El Tepeyac Cafe has become a Boyle Heights staple in the years since its original conception in 1952. In 2011, the El Tepeyac craze grew as the Rojas family opened a second location near the City of Industry.

On February 12, 2013, El Tepeyac’s beloved owner, Manuel Rojas, died at age 79, after a year long battle with esophageal cancer. Rojas died on a Tuesday evening at White Memorial Medical Center in Los Angeles.

In September 2020, Manuel's grandson Carlos Thome opened a second El Tepeyac Cafe location in Pasadena. He introduced the Pasadena area to the "Pasadena Bowl" that has quickly become a fan favorite.

Copycat restaurants 
In 2015, loyal El Tepeyac customers came to the restaurant's defense when reports of a copycat near Syracuse, New York surfaced. This restaurant, called El Tepeyac Hacienda, was created by Sean Martinez and had nearly identical menu items, and served the iconic “Hollenbeck Burrito,” that the original El Tepeyac was famous for.  Martinez claimed he had an agreement with the late Manuel Rojas, which the Rojas family vehemently denies. In 2015, Martinez stated “We have never claimed to be a franchise of the original nor do we share the same name or menu.” He also claimed his restaurant was very popular and ran out of food each day. The El Tepeyac Hacienda restaurant located in Syracuse, New York has since closed. 

According to the Rojas family, Martinez first attempted to open a copycat establishment in 2010 in Chino Hills, California, only about 30 miles from the original El Tepeyac location. This restaurant ended up closing in 2010, shortly after its inception.

On television 
On February 18, 2009, El Tepeyac Cafe was featured in one of the Travel Channel’s most popular shows, Man vs. Food.

On July 24, 2014, El Tepeyac Cafe was featured on Esquire TV’s show, Best Bars in America.

On January 15, 2017, El Tepeyac Cafe was featured on the Travel Channel’s show, Food Paradise. The episode in which it was featured is called “Best Mex.”

References

1942 establishments in California
Boyle Heights, Los Angeles
Mexican restaurants in California
Restaurants in Greater Los Angeles